Yura Min (Hangul: 민유라; born August 15, 1995) is a Korean-American ice dancer who skates with Daniel Eaton for South Korea, with whom she is the 2020 Korean National Champion. With former partner Alexander Gamelin, she is a two-time South Korean national champion. They finished seventh at the 2018 Four Continents Championships and participated in the 2018 Winter Olympics at Pyeongchang, South Korea.

Personal life 
Yura Min was born on August 15, 1995, in Torrance, California, to Hye Young Chu of Busan, South Korea, and Harrison Min of Seoul, South Korea. She is a citizen of both the United States and South Korea.

Career

Early career 
Min started learning to skate in 2001. She teamed up with Igor Ogay in 2012. Competing on the junior level, they took silver at the Pacific Coast Sectionals and qualified for the 2013 U.S. Championships, where they finished 11th. Their partnership then came to an end.

Min teamed up with Timothy Koleto in April 2013. Representing South Korea, the duo placed tenth at the 2014 Four Continents Championships and eighth at an ISU Challenger Series event, the 2014 CS Nebelhorn Trophy. They finished fifth at their last event together, the International Cup of Nice in October 2014. Igor Shpilband and Greg Zuerlein coached them in Novi, Michigan.

Partnership with Gamelin

2015–2016 season 
In 2015, Min teamed up with Alexander Gamelin. They were coached by Igor Shpilband, Fabian Bourzat, Greg Zuerlein, and Adrienne Lenda in Novi, Michigan.

Making their international debut, Min/Gamelin placed fifth at the 2015 CS Ice Challenge. After finishing fourth at the NRW Trophy and seventh at the 2015 CS Warsaw Cup, they were awarded silver behind Rebeka Kim / Kirill Minov at the 2016 South Korean Championships. At the 2016 Four Continents Championships in Taipei, they placed ninth in the short dance, eighth in the free dance, and eighth overall, ending up as the top Korean dancers at the event.

2016–2017 season 
Starting their second competitive season together with an early event, the 2016 Lake Placid Ice Dance International, Min/Gamelin placed third in the short dance and second in the free dance, winning the bronze medal overall. The team finished in the top six for all three ISU Challenger Series competitions skated, the U.S. International Figure Skating Classic, the Nebelhorn Trophy, and the CS Tallinn Trophy, and made their ISU Grand Prix debut at Skate America finishing in 10th place. They advanced to Free Dance and placed 20th at 2017 World Figure Skating Championships in Helsinki. On the domestic front, Min and Gamelin earned the gold medal in senior dance at both the 2017 KSU President Cup Ranking Competition and the 2017 South Korean Figure Skating Championships.

2017–2018 season 
Min/Gamelin decided to skate to Arirang for their free dance. In September, they competed at the 2017 CS Nebelhorn Trophy, the final qualifying opportunity for the 2018 Winter Olympics. They finished fourth, earning a spot for South Korea in the Olympic ice dancing event.

On July 18, 2018, Min and Gamelin announced the end of their partnership.

Partnership with Eaton 
On September 22, 2018, Min and Daniel Eaton announced they had formed a partnership.

2019–2020 season
Min/Eaton began their partnership competing in several minor competitions, and two Challengers, placing ninth at both the 2019 CS Nebelhorn Trophy and the 2019 CS Golden Spin of Zagreb. After winning the South Korean national title, they placed eighth at the 2020 Four Continents Championships. They were assigned to make their World Championship debut, but the COVID-19 pandemic resulted in that event's cancellation.

2020–2021 season
Due to Eaton suffering from back problems, Min and Eaton did not compete during the 2020–21 season.

2021–2022 season
Min/Eaton initially planned to skate their rhythm dance to a medley of Queen songs, but after receiving critiques from judges at the Lake Placid Ice Dance International as to whether it suited the street dance theme, they changed it to a Macklemore theme. They two competed at the 2021 CS Nebelhorn Trophy, seeking to qualify a place for South Korea at the 2022 Winter Olympics, but came seventh at the event and were named only the second reserve.

Programs

With Daniel Eaton

With Gamelin

With Koleto

With Ogay

Competitive highlights 
GP: Grand Prix; CS: Challenger Series; JGP: Junior Grand Prix

With Eaton

With Gamelin

With Koleto

With Ogay

Detailed results

with Alexander Gamelin 

At team events, medals awarded for team results only.

with Timothy Koleto

with Igor Ogay 

Personal bests highlighted in bold.

References

External links 

 
 
 Official website of Yura Min and Alexander Gamelin

1995 births
Living people
South Korean ice dance teams
South Korean female ice dancers
American female ice dancers
People from Torrance, California
Figure skaters at the 2018 Winter Olympics
Olympic figure skaters of South Korea
American sportspeople of Korean descent
American people of South Korean descent
20th-century American women
21st-century American women
American dancers of Asian descent